Sir William Grey-Wilson  (7 April 1852 – 14 February 1926) was a British colonial administrator.

He was born William Wilson, the son of Andrew Wilson, Inspector-General of Hospitals, Honorable East India Company and his wife Catherine Grey. He was educated at Cheltenham College.

In 1874 he became Private Secretary to Sir William Grey, the Governor of Jamaica and in 1877 to Sir Frederick Palgrave Barlee, Lieutenant Governor of British Honduras. In 1878 Grey-Wilson was appointed Clerk of the Executive and Legislative Councils of British Honduras and in 1884 Assistant Colonial Secretary of the Gold Coast.

In 1886 he served as Colonial Secretary of St Helena and from 1887 to 1897 as Governor of St Helena. From 1897 to 1904 he was Governor of the Falkland Islands and from 1904 to 1912 Governor of the Bahamas. He was knighted KCMG in 1904  and KBE in 1918.

He died in 1926. He had married Margaret, the daughter of Robert Glasgow Brown, of Broadstone, Ayrshire and had 2 sons and a daughter.

References 

1852 births
1926 deaths
People educated at Cheltenham College
British governors of the Bahamas
Governors of the Falkland Islands
Governors of Saint Helena
British colonial governors and administrators in the Americas
British colonial governors and administrators in Africa

Knights Commander of the Order of St Michael and St George
Knights Commander of the Order of the British Empire